The Acty Shiodome is a 190-metre, 56-storey residential skyscraper in the Shiodome area of Minato-Ku, Tokyo, Japan. It was constructed between April 2000 and February 2004, and is currently the second tallest residential building in Japan. The building has a nickname of "La Tour Shiodome", which is actually the name of the private luxury units on the top floors. The building has a total of 768 units, with 683 rental units between the 3rd and 44th floors, and 85 private luxury units on floors 45 to 56.  The building is owned by the Urban Development Corporation, part of the Urban Renaissance Agency. Floors 45 to 56 are offered for rent through Urban Development Corporation's "Private Enterprise Rental Housing System". The first two floors contain shops, a day care centre, and medical clinics. The JR Yokosuka Line passes directly under the building, which is flanked by the Yurikamome New Transit line on the west and south sides, and the Shuto Expressway on the east.

Local Places of Interest
 Hamarikyu Gardens (浜離宮恩賜庭園) - 1/4 mile Northeast
 Kyu Shiba Rikyu Garden (旧芝離宮) - 1/4 mile South
 Acty Shiodome Steps Garden - Adjacent on North side of Acty Shiodome site
  - Adjacent on North side of Acty Shiodome site
 Pokémon Center Tokyo - Located in the building next door.
 Shopping Mall - Shiodome City Center (汐留シティセンター) - 8-10 min. walk
 Tsukiji Fish Market (築地市場) - 15 min walk

Transportation
Daimon Subway Station (5 min. walk)
Hammatsucho Train Station (5 min. walk)
Shiodome Train Station (6 min. walk)
Shimbashi Train Station (10 min. walk)
 Car Parking: 366 Spaces in structure attached by walkway
 Bicycle Parking: Located on first basement floor
 Motorcycle Parking: Located on first basement floor
 Helicopter Pad: Located on Roof

Directions
 From Daimon Subway Station:  Follow signs to Exit B1. Walk 300 feet (100 metres) straight ahead (east), cross a small side street, go up escalator on your left, La Tour/Acty Shiodome is the 2nd Bldg. Google Map
 From Hammatsucho Train Station: Take the North Exit. Cross the main road, go right (east), walk 300 feet (100 metres), cross a small side street, go up Escalator on left, La Tour/Acty Shiodome is the 2nd Bldg.  Google Map

References 

Residential buildings completed in 2004
Shiodome
Buildings and structures in Minato, Tokyo
Residential skyscrapers in Tokyo
Retail buildings in Tokyo
2004 establishments in Japan